Anbarabad County is in Kerman province, Iran. The capital of the county is the city of Anbarabad. In 2003 Anbarabad was recognized as a county and separated from Jiroft County. At the 2006 census, the county's population was 113,751 in 23,858 households. The following census in 2011 counted 85,942 people in 20,947 households, by which time Esmaili District had been separated from the county to join Jiroft County. At the 2016 census, Anbarabad County's population was 82,438 in 23,409 households. Most residents are ethnic Persians and speak that language.

Administrative divisions

The population history and structural changes of Anbarabad County's administrative divisions over three consecutive censuses are shown in the following table. The latest census shows two districts, seven rural districts, and three cities.

References

 

Counties of Kerman Province